Diyarbakır Atatürk Stadium is a multi-purpose stadium in Diyarbakır, Turkey.  It is currently used mostly for football matches and is the home stadium of Diyarbakırspor.  The stadium holds 12,963 and was built in 1960.

Football venues in Turkey
Sport in Diyarbakır
Buildings and structures in Diyarbakır
Sports venues completed in 1960
Multi-purpose stadiums in Turkey
Süper Lig venues
Diyarbakırspor
Things named after Mustafa Kemal Atatürk